The Fox Lake Railroad Depot is located in Fox Lake, Wisconsin.

History
The depot was built by the Chicago, Milwaukee, St. Paul and Pacific Railroad (Milwaukee Road) in 1884, with porte-cochère added in 1919. It served passengers including resort patrons until the 1950s and freight until 1970. Currently, it serves as a museum.

It was listed on the National Register of Historic Places in 1978 and the State Register of Historic Places in 1989.

References

Railway stations on the National Register of Historic Places in Wisconsin
National Register of Historic Places in Dodge County, Wisconsin
Fox Lake, Wisconsin
History museums in Wisconsin
Museums in Dodge County, Wisconsin
Former railway stations in Wisconsin
Railway stations in the United States opened in 1884